David Williams  (1862–1936) was the Archdeacon of Cardigan from 1928 until his death.

Williams was educated at Llandysul Grammar School and Durham University; and ordained in 1890. He was a theology exhibitioner at Hatfield Hall. After curacies in Stella and Swansea he held incumbencies in Clydach and Llangyfelach.
He died on 24 March 1936.

References

1862 births
1936 deaths
People educated at Llandysul Grammar School
Alumni of Hatfield College, Durham
Archdeacons of Cardigan